Karangtengah inscription (also known as Kayumwungan inscription) is the inscriptions written on five pieces of stones dated 746 Saka or 824 CE, discovered in Karangtengah hamlet, Temanggung Regency, Central Java, Indonesia. The inscription was written in ancient Javanese script in two languages; Old Javanese and Sanskrit. The lines 1-24 was written in Sanskrit, the rest of the lines was written in old Javanese. The inscription is linked with the temple Borobudur and Mendut

Contents
The parts written in Sanskrit mentioned about a king named Samaratungga. His daughter named Pramodhawardhani has inaugurated a Jinalaya (Sanskrit meaning:Jain temple and the realm of those have conquer worldly desire and reach enlightenment called jina which is also a common epithet of the Buddha which is most likely the intended meaning here ), a sacred Jina sanctuary. The inscription also mentioned a sacred buddhist building called Venuvana (Sankirt: bamboo forest) to place the cremated ashes of 'king of the cloud', the name for god Indra, probably referred to King Indra of Sailendra dynasty. Jinalaya was identified as Borobudur. Venuvana was identified as Mendut temple by Dutch archaeologist JG de Casparis, while Soekmono identified it with Ngawen temple instead.

In the parts written in old Javanese, mentioned about an event, that in the 10th day of Kresnapaksa in the month of Jyestha year 746 Saka (824 CE), Rakai Patapan pu Palar inaugurated that rice fields in Kayumwungan to be the tax free land protected by royal edict. Rakai Patapan pu Palar is identified as Rakai Garung, the king of Mataram Kingdom. Indonesian historian Slamet Muljana suggest Rakai Garung was another name of Samaratungga.

See also
Canggal inscription (732)
Kalasan inscription (778)
Kelurak inscription (782)
Mantyasih inscription (907)
Laguna Copperplate Inscription (900)
Shivagrha inscription (856)
Tri Tepusan inscription (842)
Buddhism in Indonesia
Candi of Indonesia
Hinduism in Java
Indonesian Esoteric Buddhism

References

Sanskrit inscriptions in Indonesia
9th-century inscriptions
Shailendra dynasty
824
Central Java